Walter Camp (1859–1925) was American football coach dubbed the "Father of American Football".

Walter Camp is also the name of:

Walter Mason Camp (1867–1925), American railroad expert and writer
Walter de Camp (died 2017), pseudonym of a Finnish writer

Walter Camp may also refer to named after the football coach:
Walter Camp Alumni of the Year Award
Walter Camp Award
Walter Camp Coach of the Year Award
Walter Camp Distinguished American Award
Walter Camp Football Foundation
Walter Camp Man of the Year Award

Camp, Walter